Elyria may refer to:

Elyria, Ohio, city in Ohio, United States
Elyria (Amtrak station), Amtrak station in Elyria, Ohio
Elyria, Kansas, unincorporated community in Kansas, United States
Elyria, Nebraska, village in Nebraska, United States
Elyria Township, Valley County, Nebraska
Elyria Township, Lorain County, Ohio
Elyria (album), 1994 album by Faith and the Muse